Don Alonzo Joshua Upham (May 1, 1809July 19, 1877) was an American lawyer, Democratic politician, and Wisconsin pioneer. He served as the 4th Mayor of Milwaukee and was the Democratic nominee for Governor of Wisconsin in the 1851 election.

Early life
Upham was born in Weathersfield, Windsor County, Vermont in 1809. After graduating from Union College in Schenectady, New York, in 1831, he taught mathematics for three years at the University of Delaware in Newark, Delaware.

He then studied law privately in Delaware under James A. Bayard, Jr. He practiced law after being admitted to the Delaware bar in 1835. That year, he was also elected the Wilmington City Attorney. He was the owner and editor of The Delaware Gazette for three years. In 1837, Upham traveled west, eventually settling in the village of Milwaukee in the Wisconsin Territory, where he continued to work as a lawyer.

Political career
Upham held various political positions and in 1840 he served as a member of the Territorial Council, the upper house in the territory's legislature. He served in the Territorial Legislature from 1840 to 1842. In 1843 he was the Milwaukee County Attorney, and in 1846 he served as president of the first Wisconsin Constitutional Convention—though the constitution produced by this convention was not ratified by the voters. Upham served two one-year terms as Mayor of Milwaukee, for 1849 and 1850.

Upham was the Democratic nominee for Governor of Wisconsin in 1851, but fell 507 votes short of Whig candidate Leonard J. Farwell.

In 1858, President James Buchanan appointed Upham United States Attorney for the District of Wisconsin, where he served until his successor was appointed in 1861.

He died in Milwaukee, Wisconsin, on July 19, 1877, and is interred in Milwaukee's historic Forest Home Cemetery.

Family life
Upham was the son of Joshua Upham and Phebe (Chamberlain) Upham. He married Elizabeth Smith Jaques October 20, 1836, and they were married until his death. They had five children: John Jaques Upham, Adelaide Upham, Horace Alonzo Upham, Caroline Jaques Upham and Sarah Maria Upham.

Horace's former summer home, now known as Wawbeek-Horace A.J. Upham House, is listed on the National Register of Historic Places.

The Uphams were descended from Massachusetts Bay colonist John Upham, who arrived in 1680 and settled in Malden.

References

External links
 

1809 births
1877 deaths
Members of the Wisconsin Territorial Legislature
Mayors of Milwaukee
Union College (New York) alumni
University of Delaware faculty
People from Weathersfield, Vermont
Wisconsin Democrats
Delaware lawyers
United States Attorneys for the District of Wisconsin
19th-century American newspaper editors
19th-century American newspaper publishers (people)
American male journalists
19th-century American male writers
19th-century American politicians
Burials in Wisconsin
19th-century American lawyers